Sunny Side Inn, also known as the Sunny Side Oyster Bar, is a historic oyster bar located at Williamston, Martin County, North Carolina.  The original section was built in 1929 as a one-story, gable front frame building housing the Sanitary Service Market. It was enlarged in 1930–1931 with the addition of a front gable room for a lunch room and a rear addition housing the oyster bar was built between 1935 and 1940.  The building is sheathed in weatherboard and has American Craftsman-style exposed roof rafters.

It was listed on the National Register of Historic Places in 1995.

See also
 List of oyster bars

References

External links
Sunnyside Oyster Bar Yelp link

Oyster bars in the United States
Commercial buildings on the National Register of Historic Places in North Carolina
Commercial buildings completed in 1929
Buildings and structures in Martin County, North Carolina
National Register of Historic Places in Martin County, North Carolina